The Handball events at the 1999 All-Africa Games were held in Johannesburg, South Africa from 11 to 18 September 1999.

Qualified teams

Squads

Final tournament
All times are local (UTC+2).

Matches

Part 1

Part 2

Tournament classification

References

 
1999 All-Africa Games
1999
African Games